"Everywhere You Go" is a song by Australian rock band Taxiride. It was released as the band's second single from their 1999 debut album, Imaginate, in September 1999, becoming the band's second top-20 single in their home country. It was certified gold by the Australian Recording Industry Association (ARIA).

Track listings
Australian CD single
 "Everywhere You Go" – 3:35
 "Get Set" (original demo version) – 3:00

European CD single
 "Everywhere You Go" (acoustic intro) – 3:33
 "A Stone in the Ocean" – 2:50

Charts

Weekly charts

Year-end charts

Certifications

Release history

References

Taxiride songs
1999 singles
1999 songs
Sire Records singles
Song recordings produced by Jack Joseph Puig
Warner Music Group singles